Scouting magazine is a publication of the Boy Scouts of America (BSA). The target audience is adult leaders of Cub Scouts, Scouts, and Venturers. It carries news on Scouting events, articles on aspects of Scouting such as service, outdoor skills and activities, and features about Scouting activities. It began publication on April 15, 1913, with five-times-a-year mail subscriptions included in the registration fee for all volunteer leaders registered with the BSA.  The last print edition was the May–June 2020 issue, although online content continues to be updated.

Recurring content includes: Feature articles, Trailhead, What I've Learned, Advancement FAQs, Cub Scout Corner, Nature of Boys, What Would You Do?, Merit Badge Clinic, Ethics, Great Gear, Health & Wellness, Survive This!, Fuel Up, Dutch Treat, Boys' Life Preview, and Cool Camp.

See also

 Scout Life

References

External links
 Scouting, official Web site
 Bryan on Scouting, official blog
 Scouting, archives
 Scouting archives at Ten Mile River Scout Museum
 
 Scouting archives at the Portal to Texas History

1913 establishments in the United States
2020 disestablishments in Texas
Boy Scouts of America
Defunct magazines published in the United States
Literature of the Boy Scouts of America
Magazines established in 1913
Magazines disestablished in 2020
Magazines published in Texas
Monthly magazines published in the United States
Online magazines published in the United States
Online magazines with defunct print editions